This is a list of Swedish-language novelists, poets and other writers.


A 
Emmy Abrahamson (born 1976)
Alf Ahlberg (1892–1979)
Lars Ahlin (1915–1997)
Astrid Ahnfelt (1876–1962)
John Ajvide Lindqvist (born 1968)
Gallie Åkerhielm (1907–1968)
Sonja Åkesson (1926–1977)
Hans Alfredson (1931–2017)
Karin Alfredsson (born 1953)
Carl Jonas Love Almqvist (1793–1866)
Einar Askestad (born 1964)
Per Daniel Amadeus Atterbom (1790–1855)
Dan Andersson (1888–1920)
Anders Annerfalk (born 1959)
Britt Arenander (born 1941)
Werner Aspenström (1918–1997)
Majgull Axelsson (born 1947)

B 
Carl Michael Bellman (1740–1795)
Victoria Benedictsson (1850–1888)
Frans G. Bengtsson (1894–1954)
Bo Bergman (1869–1967)
Hjalmar Bergman (1883–1931)
Elsa Beskow (1874–1953)
Elisabeth Bergstrand-Poulsen (1887–1955)
Eva Billow (1902–1993)
Marcus Birro (born 1972)
Elsa Björkman-Goldschmidt (1888–1982)
August Blanche (1811–1868)
August Bondeson (1854–1906)
Karin Boye (1900–1941)
Fredrika Bremer (1801–1865)
Annika Bryn (born 1945)

C 
Bo Carpelan (1926–2011)
Camilla Ceder (born 1976)
Siv Cedering (1939–2007)
Stig Claesson (1928–2008)

D 
Stig Dagerman (1923–1954)
Olof von Dalin (1708–1763)
Tage Danielsson (1928–1985)
Sven Delblanc (1931–1992)
Walter Dickson (1916–1990)
Ernst Didring (1868–1931)
Elmer Diktonius (1896–1961)

E 
Inger Edelfeldt (born 1956)
Johannes Edfelt (1904–1997)
Åke Edwardson   (born 1953)
Lena Einhorn (born 1954)
Vilhelm Ekelund (1880–1949)
Gunnar Ekelöf (1907–1968)
Kerstin Ekman (born 1933)
Sigrid Elmblad (1860–1926), journalist, poet and translator.
Per Olov Enquist (1934–2020)
Helena Eriksson (born 1962)
Maria Ernestam (born 1959)

F 
Nils Ferlin (1898–1961), poet
Torbjörn Flygt (born 1964)
Per Anders Fogelström (1917–1998)
Lars Forssell (1928–2007)
Tua Forsström (born 1947)
Marianne Fredriksson (1927–2007)
Gustaf Fröding (1860–1911), poet

G 
Jonas Gardell (born 1963)
Anders Abraham Grafström (1790–1870)
Elsa Grave (1918–2003)
Maria Gripe (1923–2007)
Jan Guillou (born 1944), journalist, novelist
Hjalmar Gullberg (1898–1961)
Lars Gyllensten (1921–2006)

H 
Carl August Hagberg (1810–1864)
Stefan Hammarén (born 1963)
Bob Hansson (born 1970)
Verner von Heidenstam (1859–1940)
Alf Henrikson (1905–1995)
Marie Hermanson (born 1956)
Rut Hillarp (1914–2003)
Sverre Holmsen (1906–1992)

J 
Tove Jansson (1914–2001)
P.C. Jersild (born 1935)
Eyvind Johnson (1900–1976)
Harry Järv (1921–2009)

K 
Mons Kallentoft (born 1968)
Theodor Kallifatides (born 1938)
Mare Kandre (1962–2005)
Erik Axel Karlfeldt (1864–1931)
Agneta Klingspor (1946–2022)
Martin Koch (1882–1940)
 Sara Kristoffersson (born 1972)
Niklas Krog (born 1965)
Agnes von Krusenstjerna (1894–1940)
 Elisabeth Kuylenstierna-Wenster (1869–1933)
Willy Kyrklund (1921–2009)

L 
Camilla Läckberg (born 1974)
Ann-Helén Laestadius (born 1971), Sami journalist and children's novelist
Olof Lagercrantz (1911–2002)
Pär Lagerkvist (1891–1974)
Selma Lagerlöf (1858–1940)
Dagmar Lange (Maria Lang) (1914–1991)
Viveca Lärn (born 1944)
Stieg Larsson (1954–2004)
Stig Larsson (born 1955)
Anna Maria Lenngren (1754–1817)
Oscar Levertin (1862–1906)
Li Li (born 1961)
Sara Lidman (1923–2004)
Elsa Lindberg-Dovlette (1874–1944)
Astrid Lindgren (1907–2002)
Barbro Lindgren (born 1937)
Torgny Lindgren (1938–2017)
Herman Lindqvist (born 1943)
John Ajvide Lindqvist (born 1968)
Sven Lindqvist (1932–2019)
Fredrik Lindström (born 1963)
Jonas Carl Linnerhielm (1758–1829)
Ivar Lo-Johansson (1901–1990)
Lasse Lucidor (1638–1674)
Kristina Lugn (1948–2020)
Artur Lundkvist (1906–1991)

M 
Bertil Malmberg (1889–1958)
Bodil Malmsten (1944–2016)
Henning Mankell (1948–2015)
Gerda Marcus (1880–1952), journalist
Liza Marklund (born 1962)
Harry Martinson (1904–1978)
Moa Martinson(1890–1964)
Erik Mesterton (1903–2004)
Vilhelm Moberg (1898–1973)
Lukas Moodysson (born 1969), published poetry before becoming a film director
Jan Myrdal (1927–2020)

N 
Håkan Nesser (born 1950)
Mikael Niemi (born 1959)
Peter Nilson (1937–1998)
Hedvig Charlotta Nordenflycht (1718–1763)
Sven Nordqvist (born 1946)
Adolf Noreen (1854–1925)
Julia Nyberg (1784–1854)

O 
Albert Olsson (1904–1994)
Jan Olof Olsson (1920–1974), pen name Jolo
Vladimir Oravsky (born 1947)
Johan Gabriel Oxenstierna (1750–1818)
Bruno K. Öijer (born 1951), poet
Klas Östergren (born 1955)

P 
Malte Persson (born 1976)
Agneta Pleijel (born 1940)
Peter Pohl (born 1940)

R 
Povel Ramel (1922–2007)
Björn Ranelid (born 1949)
Märta Helena Reenstierna (1753–1841)
Ann Rosman (born 1973)
Johan Ludvig Runeberg (1804–1877)
Viktor Rydberg (1828–1895)

S 
 Shamm Shamayi Salih (born 2000), writer
Irmelin Sandman Lilius (born 1936)
Eugen Semitjov (1923–1987), writer, journalist and artist
Malla Silfverstolpe (1782–1861), diarist
Maj Sjöwall (1935–2020)
Erik Johan Stagnelius (1793–1823), Romantic poet
Georg Stiernhielm (1598–1672)
Jan Stocklassa (born 1965)
August Strindberg (1849–1912)
Eva Ström (born 1947)
Fredrik Ström (1880–1948)
Per Olof Sundman (1922–1992)
Maria Sveland (born 1974)
Hjalmar Söderberg (1869–1941)
Edith Södergran (1892–1923)

T 
Evert Taube (1890–1976)
Esaias Tegnér (1782–1846), poet
Kerstin Thorvall (1925–2010)
Carl L. Thunberg (born 1963)
Zacharias Topelius (1818–1898), poet and writer
Tomas Tranströmer (1931–2015), poet
Stieg Trenter (1914–1967)
Birgitta Trotzig (1929–2011)
Göran Tunström (1937–2000)
Helene Tursten (born 1954)

V 
Gunnel Vallquist (1918–2016)
Carl-Johan Vallgren (born 1964)

W 
Per Wahlöö (1926–1975)
Elin Wägner (1882–1949)
Eva Waldemarsson (1908–1986)
Per Wästberg (born 1933)
Adéle Weman (1844–1936), wrote under the names Parus Ater, Inga Storm and Zakarias
Einar af Wirsén (1875–1946)

Z 
Joakim Zander (born 1975)

References

See also 
List of Finnish women writers
List of Swedish poets
List of Swedish women writers
List of Swedes
Lists of authors
Svenska Vitterhetssamfundet

Swedish language
Writers
Swedish